Downham is a district of south east London, England.

Downham may also refer to:

Places
in England
Downham, Cambridgeshire, a civil parish
Little Downham
Downham, Essex
Downham, Lancashire
Downham, a common name of Downham Market, Norfolk
Downham West, Norfolk
Downham, South Norfolk
Downham, Northumberland
The Downham Estate, housing estate in Downham, London

People with the surname
George Downham (1560-1634), bishop of Derry
Jenny Downham, British novelist
John Downham (1571-1652), English clergyman
William Downham (1511–1577), bishop of Chester

Other uses
HMS Downham, a minesweeper